Homosalate is an organic compound used in some sunscreens. It is made by the Fischer–Speier esterification of salicylic acid and 3,3,5-trimethylcyclohexanol, the latter being a hydrogenated derivative of isophorone. Contained in 45% of U.S. sunscreens, it is used as a chemical UV filter. The salicylic acid portion of the molecule absorbs ultraviolet rays with a wavelength from 295 nm to 315 nm, protecting the skin from sun damage. The hydrophobic trimethyl cyclohexyl group provides greasiness that prevents it from dissolving in water.

Safety

Similar to other UV filter compounds, more homosalate is absorbed into the uppermost stratum corneum (ie, the stratum disjunctum) of the face (25% of applied dose) versus back of volunteers. This amounted to approximately two to three times the amount of sunscreen that was present in the superficial stratum corneum layers of the face compared with the back. There was no homosalate detected in the urine samples or blood plasma samples of the volunteers in this study. 

Homosalate has been identified as an antiandrogen in vitro, as well as having estrogenic activity toward estrogen receptors α, and general in vitro estrogenic activity. Homosalate has been shown to be an antagonist toward androgen and estrogen receptors in vitro. Some work has shown that organic UV filters in general can present concerns.

There is no in vivo evidence of toxicity, endocrine disfunction or adverse effects; and none of these adverse events have ever been reported to occur in humans.

An invivo study involving repeated subcutaneous injections of homosalate at dose levels up to 1000mg/kg of body weight to juvenile female Wistar rats over three consecutive days revealed no estrogenic potential in the uterotrophic assay. Another study on immature Long-Evans rats receiving up to 892 mg/kg of body weight of homosalate in their daily diet found no estrogenic effects in vivo. Research on zebra fish also found no estrogenic effects after being continuously exposed to homosalate for 96 hours straight.
The SCCS has declared there is no sufficient evidence that identifies pure homosalate as an endocrine disruptor in humans and further declared that invivo research has confirmed that homosalate has no genotoxic, phototoxic or photosensitive effects when applied topically.

References

3,3,5-Trimethylcyclohexyl esters
Salicylate esters
Sunscreening agents
3-Hydroxypropenals